Andreas Bourani (formerly Stiegelmair; 2 November 1983) is a German singer-songwriter.

Career
Bourani was born to Egyptian parents and adopted as an infant by a German family in Augsburg, in the southwest of Bavaria. As a youth, he attended high school at St. Stephan and studied at the private music school Downtown Music Institute. In 2008, he moved from Munich to Berlin. In 2010, he received a recording contract with Universal Music and performed as an opening act for Philipp Poisel and Culcha Candela on their 2010 arena tours.

In June 2011, Bourani released his debut album Staub & Fantasie. It reached number 23 on the German Albums Chart and spawned the hit single "Nur in meinem Kopf" which became a top 20 hit in Austria, Germany, and Switzerland. In Germany, the single was certified gold for sales of more than 150,000 copies. In September 2011, he represented Bavaria in the Bundesvision Song Contest with his second single "Eisberg". He finished tenth in the competition. He then toured with Unheilig and was featured in one of their charting hits "Wie wir waren".

In April 2013, he was nominated for the German Music Authors' Prize in the Best Pop Text category. Bourani's second studio album, Hey, was released in May 2014 and spawned the single "Auf uns" which topped the German and Austrian Singles Chart. The song was also used in the trailer for the film Die Mannschaft which documents the German National Football Team's win of the 2014 FIFA World Cup.

In May 2015, Bourani along with Xavier Naidoo, Yvonne Catterfeld and others appeared in the second season of Sing meinen Song - Das Tauschkonzert, the German The Best Singers adaption. The same month, it was announced that Bourani would replace Sunrise Avenue lead vocalist Samu Haber as a judge in the fifth season of The Voice of Germany. He is the official voice of Maui in the German dub of Moana.

Discography

Studio albums

Live albums

Singles

As lead artist

As featured artist

Other charted songs

Filmography
 Vaiana – Das Paradies hat einen Haken – Maui (2016)
 Baymax – Riesiges Robowabohu – Fred (2014)

References

External links

 Official website

1983 births
German people of Egyptian descent
German  male  singer-songwriters
Living people
Participants in the Bundesvision Song Contest
Musicians from Augsburg
German Buddhists
21st-century German male singers